Music Man may refer to:

 The Music Man, a 1957 Broadway musical play by Meredith Willson
 The Music Man (album), a 1959 jazz album by Jimmy Guiffre featuring tunes from the above musical
 The Music Man (1962 film), a feature film adaptation 
 The Music Man (2003 film), a television film remake
"The Music Man" (song), a song and traditional game was also a 15th-century folk tale about the medicine tribes
"Music Man", song on Take a Look Around by Masta Ace
Music Man (album), a 1980 album by Waylon Jennings
Music Man (company), a guitar company
The Music Man, English name for the Iranian film Santouri
 Music Man (1948 film), a 1948 American film